Field hockey at the 1984 Summer Olympics in Los Angeles took place from 29 July to 11 August 1984 at the Weingart Stadium, in Monterey Park.

Men's tournament

Preliminary round

Group A

Group B

Medal round

Final standings

Women's tournament

The United States and Australia played out a penalty shoot-out for the bronze medal after finishing equal on points and goal difference in the round robin stage, which the United States won 10–5.

Pool

Final standings

Medal summary

Medal table

Medalists

 Penalty stroke competition for the bronze medal: United States defeated Australia 10–5.
 Both teams had a 2–2–1 record and 9 goals for and 7 goals against.  Canada also had a 2–2–1 record but had 9 goals for and 11 goals against.
 West Germany finished just ahead of the tied teams with a 2–1–2 record to claim silver.

See also
 Field hockey at the 1984 Summer Olympics – Men's team squads
 Field hockey at the 1984 Summer Olympics – Women's team squads
 Field hockey at the Friendship Games

Notes

References
 1984 Olympic Official Report
 Pakistan Hockey – Olympic Games

External links

 
Field hockey at the Summer Olympics
1984 Summer Olympics events
Summer Olympics
1984 Summer Olympics